Valery Ivanovich Inkizhinov (25 March 1895 – 26 September 1973), known as Valéry Inkijinoff, was a Russian actor, director and acting teacher. Born to a Buryat family in Irkutsk, he began his career in the Soviet Union, playing the lead role in Vsevolod Pudovkin's 1928 film Storm Over Asia. He immigrated to France in the 1930s, where his strong facial features made him a favorite villain for exotic adventure and crime films.

Early life 
Inkijinoff was born in Irkutsk gubernia to a Christian Buryat father and an ethnic Russian mother. He studied at the Polytechnical Institute of Saint Petersburg, and for a time one of the resident actors of an imperial theater of the city. He studied acting under Vsevolod Meyerhold, where he helped develop the rehearsal technique of biomechanics. He joined Meyerhold's troupe in Moscow, where he also studied with Lev Kuleshov.

Career
At the beginning of his career in Russia, he appeared first as stuntman in a few movies and then as director and as actor. His major lead role during the Russian part of his career is Bair in Storm Over Asia by Vsevolod Pudovkin in 1928, a major Soviet propaganda film about a fictional British consolidation of Mongolia. He was also an actor in the troop of Vsevolod Meyerhold and was then appointed as director of the movie and theater school of Kiev.

In 1930, while in France on a European tour, he refused to return to the USSR. According to Boris Shumyatsky, after Stalin learned Inkijinoff had never returned in 1934, said: "Too bad that the man escaped. Now he, probably, is dying to come back but, alas, too late." He starred in 2 movies while living in the Soviet Union, and contrary to Stalin's assumption, Inkijinoff became immensely popular in Europe, arguably the most successful Soviet actor abroad, starring in a total of 44 French, British, German, and Italian films.

In France he frequently played the part of Asian villains. He played for Fritz Lang in 1959, in Der Tiger von Eschnapur and its sequel Das indische Grabmal, in which he played the role of the high priest Yama. In 1965, Philippe de Broca cast him as Monsieur Goh, the wise but scary Chinese who guarantees to the Jean-Paul Belmondo character a certain death in Les tribulations d'un Chinois en Chine.

His last movie was with Brigitte Bardot and Claudia Cardinale, where he played the role of Indian chief Spitting Bull in Les pétroleuses.

Personal life and death 
He was a great friend of Charles Dullin and  Louis Jouvet, and had a long career in French theater, appearing for instance in Marie Galante by Jacques Deval.

He died at his home in Brunoy, Essonne, France, aged 78.

Filmography

Film

Television

References

External links
 

1895 births
1973 deaths
French male film actors
Male actors from the Russian Empire
Soviet emigrants to France
Peter the Great St. Petersburg Polytechnic University alumni
Buryat people
French people of Buryat descent
20th-century French male actors
Russian male film actors
20th-century Russian male actors
Russian people of Buryat descent